The Municipal City Council of Port Louis also known as Municipality is the local authority responsible for the administration of the city of Port Louis, Port Louis District, Mauritius. The actual Lord Mayor is Daniel Laurent and the Deputy Lord Mayor Marie Désiré Audie Paul Travailleur.

Municipal Elections
According to the Local Government Act 2011 PART III Section 11, election of councillors to Municipal Town Council shall be held in 2012 and thereafter every 6 years on such date as the President shall appoint. The council is composed of 24 councillors including the Lord Mayor and Deputy Lord Mayor who are elected for a period of 2 years, while each of the councillors represent wards throughout the city.

In the last elections held on 9 December 2012 the city was divided into 8 wards, the number of registered voters was 111 473. The following councillors were elected during the 2012 Municipal election for the Municipal City Council of Port Louis.

See also
 List of mayors of Port Louis

References

External links
 

Port Louis
Local government in Mauritius
Port Louis